Philippe Lançon is a journalist working for the French satirical weekly newspaper Charlie Hebdo, who was wounded in the terrorist attack perpetrated against that publication on 7 January 2015.

Work
Lançon works primarily for other French publications, specializing in literature. He is a weekly contributor to Charlie Hebdo.

Lançon also wrote for Libération, a newspaper in France, and is a critic on Latin American writings. He is also an educator on culture and Latin American literature, having been a guest speaker at Princeton University on occasion. In the Fall of 2015 he was expected to teach a course at Princeton titled "Writers and Dictators in Latin America."

Publications 
1998: Monography on the artist Jean Daviot, Victoire éditions, Paris
2004: 
2011: 
2016: Preface to La Légèreté, by Catherine Meurisse, Dargaud, April 2016
2013: L'Élan, Paris, éditions Gallimard, series "Blanche", 
2018: Le Lambeau, Paris, éditions Gallimard, series "Blanche", 2018, 512 pages.

Terrorist attack
Lançon was attending a weekly meeting of Charlie Hebdo at the time of the attack on 7 January 2015. He was wounded in the face by rifle fire and was left in critical condition, but ultimately survived his injuries. Once assured of his survival after long medical treatment and therapy, he wrote his story in the book  Le Lambeau [Shreds], for which he received two literary prizes in France.

Decorations 
 Chevalier of the Ordre des Arts et des Lettres (2015)

Honours 
In 2012, he was awarded the Prix Henri de Régnier of the Académie française for his work Les Îles.

In 2013, he received the Jean-Luc Lagardère award for Journalist of the Year.

In 2018, he was awarded the Prix Femina and the Prix Renaudot Jury's Special Prize for his autobiographical book Le Lambeau.

References

20th-century French journalists
21st-century French journalists
French literary critics
Charlie Hebdo people
1963 births
Living people
French male non-fiction writers
French shooting survivors
Chevaliers of the Ordre des Arts et des Lettres
Prix Femina winners